Scotorythra triscia is a moth of the family Geometridae. It was first described by Edward Meyrick in 1899. It is endemic to the Hawaiian islands of Oahu, Molokai and Maui.

External links

triscia
Endemic moths of Hawaii
Biota of Maui
Biota of Oahu